The qahal was a theocratic organizational structure in ancient Israelite society according to the Hebrew Bible. The Ashkenazi Jewish system of a self-governing community or kehila from medieval Christian Europe (France, Germany, Italy) was later adopted further east by the Polish–Lithuanian Commonwealth (16th–18th centuries) and its successors, with an elected council of laymen, the kahal, at the helm of each kehila. This institution was exported also further to the east as Jewish settlement advanced. In Poland it was abolished in 1822, and in most of the Russian Empire in 1844.

Etymology and meaning
The Hebrew word qahal, which is a close etymological relation of the name of Qoheleth (Ecclesiastes), comes from a root meaning "convoked [group]"; its Arabic cognate,  qāla, means to speak.

Where the Masoretic Text uses the term qahal, the Septuagint usually uses the Koine Greek term ekklesia, which means "summoned group" (literally, "they who are called out"). However, in one particular part of the Priestly Code, the Septuagint instead uses the term , literally meaning "gathering", where the Masoretic Text uses qahal. This last term is the origin of the word for "synagogue" in Hebrew.

Thus, the usual translation of qahal is "congregation" or "assembly", although  asuppot,  ʻaṣarah,  ʻedah,  moʻed,  miqra, and  sod are also usually translated like this.

In particular, the Biblical text consistently distinguishes between ʻedah and qahal. One passage especially makes the distinction clear; part of the Priestly Code discusses what to do if "the whole Israelite [ʻedah] commits a sin and the [qahal] is not aware of it[.]" Scholars conclude that the qahal must be a judicial body composed of representatives of the ʿedah; in some biblical passages, ʻedah is more accurately translated as "swarm".

Biblical exclusions

The Book of Deuteronomy prohibits certain members of the ʿedah from taking part in the qahal of Yahweh. In particular, it excludes mamzers, and men who were forcibly emasculated. The descendants of mamzers, up to the tenth generation, were also prohibited by this law code from taking part in the "congregation of Yahweh".

The term employed in the Septuagint for 'eunuch' most commonly refers to forcibly emasculated men, but it is also used there to denote certain foreign political officials (resembling the meaning of eunuch). This category does not include men who were born without visible testicles (conditions including cryptorchidism), or without a visible penis (conditions including hermaphroditism). There is a dispute, even in traditional Judaism, about whether this prohibited group of men should include those who have become, at some point since their birth, emasculated as the result of a disease.

No explanation of the word mamzer is given in the Masoretic Text, but the Septuagint translates it as "son of a prostitute". In the Talmud, it is suggested that the word mamzer derives from mum zar, meaning a strange blemish, and thus suggesting illicit parentage in some sense. There are differing opinions in the Talmud as to what this consists of, but the universally accepted ruling refers to the offspring of adultery (defined as relations with a married woman) or incest, as defined in the Book of Leviticus.

In the Talmud, there is a fierce dispute about whether or not the term mamzer included a child who had a Jewish mother, and a father who is either non-Jewish or a slave (or both); although the Talmud eventually concludes that this is not the case, a number of scholars now suspect that this was actually the original definition of mamzer. Abraham Geiger, a prominent Jewish scholar and rabbi of the mid 19th century, suggested that the etymological origin of mamzer might be me'am zar, which means belonging to a foreign people.

The Talmud interprets the exclusion of certain people from the qahal as a prohibition against ordinary Jews marrying such people. Additionally, the biblical reference to the "tenth generation" was interpreted, by the classical rabbis, as an idiom meaning "forever"; thus the Talmud forbids all the descendants - forever - of these people, from being married to ordinary Jews.

In Poland-Lithuania
In the 16th century, Jewish communities in the south of the Polish–Lithuanian Commonwealth began to set up new kahals to administer tax collection. Strictly speaking, the kahal was the elected lay leadership of the kehila (community). A kahal had a minimum of 8 members, and in average Jewish communities had a membership of 22–35 individuals. Their executives were elected by the local Jewish community, and consisted of 4 elders (Hebrew: zeqenim) with a further 3–5 honorary members (Hebrew: tovim). There was one kahal for each Jewish community, although smaller kahals were often made subject to larger ones.

These Polish-Lithuanian kahals quickly came to be politically autonomous bodies with major regulatory control over Jewish communities in the region. The kahals acted as autonomous administration within each town, having jurisdiction over the local Jewish population and the legal right to regulate the contact between Poles and Jews in all their social, economical and political aspects. Within the community, they administered commerce, hygiene, sanitation, charity (cf. tzedakah, mitzvot, halukkah), Jewish education, application of dietary laws (kashrut), and relations between landlords and their tenants. They provided a number of community facilities, such as a rabbi, a ritual bath (mikveh), and interest-free loans (gemachen). Kahals even had sufficient authority that they could arrange for individuals to be expelled from synagogues, excommunicating them (herem).

However, rich and powerful individuals gradually began to dominate the kahals, abusing their position for their own benefit. As a result, by the 18th century, many ordinary Jews had begun to clamour for the abolition of those institutions.

The researchers are still debating to what degree the official abolition of the kahal system (1822 in Congress Poland, and 1844 throughout the Russian Empire) was circumvented by the Jewish communities, who had internalised very deeply the spirit of local communal rule and gathered around legal associations such as the khevre kadisha (burial society). Some see the kahal-style self-administration reach far into the second half of the nineteenth century; others however, claim that the Polish magnates had usurped much of the kahals autonomy well before 1800, and others still see deep inner changes predating even the Polish partitions (1770s-90s).

After the 1844 official abolition in the Russian Empire, the kahals "continued to exist only in the Baltic region [of Russia]. Afterwards, Jewish communities were only given jurisdiction over religious and charitable affairs, and occasionally over education."

Conspiracy theories
The kahal exists as a theme in the antisemitic conspiracy theory literature. The theme originated with Jacob Brafman, a Russian Jew who had a falling out with Minsk kahal tax-agents, and to get revenge converted first to Lutheranism and then to Russian Orthodoxy, authoring polemics against the Talmud and the kahal. Brafmann authored the books The Local and Universal Jewish Brotherhoods (1868) and The Book of the Kahal (1869), claiming that the kahal was an international network under the control of the Alliance Israélite Universelle, its aim being to undermine Christian entrepreneurs, taking over their property and ultimately seizing power. This theory was taken up by anti-Jewish publications in Russia and by some Russian officials, such as P. A. Cherevin and Nikolay Pavlovich Ignatyev, who in the 1880s urged governor-generals of provinces to seek out a supposed "universal Jewish kahal."

Brafmann's image of the qahal spread throughout the world, making its way to the United States by 1881, as it was translated by Zénaïde Alexeïevna Ragozin in The Century Magazine. It prepared the groundwork for The Protocols of the Elders of Zion, and the word qahal features in that text. It is also discussed in other conspiracy works such as Edith Starr Miller's Occult Theocrasy (1933), which ties it to the Illuminati.

See also

 Aljama, Spanish name for a Jewish (or Muslim) community in Medieval Spain
 Forbidden relationships in Judaism
 Jewish ghettos in Europe, a neighbourhood where Jews lived together.
 Kehilla (modern), early 20th century successors to the Central/Eastern European qahal
 Kenesa
 Shtetl, Yiddish name for Central/Eastern European Jewish settlements
 Synagogue

References

Further reading
 Seltzer, Robert M. (1980) Jewish People, Jewish Thought: The Jewish Experience in History. New York: MacMillan. 

Jewish communities
Jewish marital law
Jewish political organizations
Jewish society
Jewish self-rule